The Order of Aeronautical Merit is an award of the Brazilian Air Force, established on 1 November 1943 by President Getúlio Vargas.  The order is presented in five grades and recognizes distinguished service and exceptional contributions to the Brazilian Air Force.

Grades
The order is awarded in the following grades:
  Grand Cross (Grã-Cruz)
  Grand Officer (Grande Oficial)
  Commander (Comendador)
  Officer (Oficial)
  Knight (Cavaleiro)

Notable recipients
 Air Chief Marshal Tanvir Mehmood Ahmed, Chief of Air Staff (2006–09), Pakistan Air Force
 Stéphane Abrial, French
 Micael Bydén, Sweden
 Ira C. Eaker, American
 Dwight D. Eisenhower, American, Grand Cross (August 5, 1946)
 Yuri Gagarin, Soviet
 Leonard T. Gerow, American
 Bruce K. Holloway, American
 Michael J. Hood, Canadian
 Jonas H. Ingram, American
 Jacques Paul Klein, American
 Curtis LeMay, American
 Luiz Inácio Lula da Silva, Brazilian
 Donald A. Quarles, American
 Guido Manini Ríos, Uruguay
 John Dale Ryan, American
 Michael E. Ryan, American
 Henri Sauvan, French

See also

 List of aviation awards

References

Orders, decorations, and medals of Brazil
Brazilian Air Force
Aviation awards
1943 establishments in Brazil
Awards established in 1943